Greg Brown (born 26 February 1943) is a former Australian rules footballer who played with Essendon in the VFL during the 1960s. 

Brown was recruited to Essendon locally and he made his debut for the seniors in 1963. He played as a defender, usually at full-back and it was at that position that he was a member of Essendon's 1965 premiership side. After a good season in 1967 where he finished second in his club's Best and fairest, injuries got the better of him and by 1969 he was playing most of his football in the reserves. He finished runner up in another award, the Gardiner Medal, that year and retired from the VFL at the end of the season to finish his career at the Waverley Football Club.

After retirement he still remained involved in football as both a commentator and Essendon administrator.

See also
 The 1965-66 Victorian District Cricket final

References

1943 births
Living people
Australian rules footballers from Victoria (Australia)
Essendon Football Club players
Essendon Football Club Premiership players
Waverley Football Club players
One-time VFL/AFL Premiership players